John Frank Cadman (born 27 March 1934) is a former English cricketer and field hockey player.  Cadman was a right-handed batsman who bowled right-arm fast.  He was born in Colchester, Essex.

Cadman played field hockey for Essex, England and Great Britain, who he represented in the 1964 Olympic Games.  As a cricketer, Cadman played 2 Minor Counties Championship matches for Suffolk in 1965, against Norfolk and the Nottinghamshire Second XI.  He made his only List A appearance for Suffolk the following season against Kent in the Gillette Cup.  In this match, he bowled 4 wicket-less overs and with the bat he scored 7 runs, before being dismissed by Stuart Leary.

References

External links
 
John Cadman at ESPNcricinfo
John Cadman at CricketArchive

1934 births
Living people
Sportspeople from Colchester
English cricketers
Suffolk cricketers
English male field hockey players
Field hockey players at the 1964 Summer Olympics
Olympic field hockey players of Great Britain
British male field hockey players